The 2014–15 Boston University Terriers men's basketball team represented Boston University during the 2014–15 NCAA Division I men's basketball season. The Terriers, led by fourth year head coach Joe Jones, played their home games at Agganis Arena, with early season games at Case Gym, and were members of the Patriot League. They finished the season 13–17, 9–9 in Patriot League play to finish in a tie for fourth place. They lost in the quarterfinals of the Patriot League tournament to Lafayette.

Previous season 
The Terriers finished the season 24–11, 15–3 in Patriot League play to win the Patriot League regular season championship. They advanced to the championship game of the Patriot League tournament where they lost to American. As a regular season league champion who failed to win their league tournament, they received an automatic bid to the National Invitation Tournament where they lost in the first round to Illinois.

Roster

Schedule

|-
!colspan=9 style="background:#CC0000; color:#FFFFFF;"| Non-conference regular season

|-
!colspan=9 style="background:#CC0000; color:#FFFFFF;"| Conference regular season

|-
!colspan=9 style="background:#CC0000; color:#FFFFFF;"| Patriot League tournament

References

Boston University Terriers men's basketball seasons
Boston University
Boston
Boston